Yasuharu Ōyama (大山 康晴 Ōyama Yasuharu, March 13, 1923 - July 26, 1992) was a professional shogi player, 15th Lifetime Meijin and president of Japan Shogi Association (1976 - 1989). He studied shogi under . He won 80 titles (2nd on record), 44 other type tournaments (2nd on record) and 1433 games (2nd on record) in life, and was awarded five lifetime titles: Lifetime Meijin, Lifetime Jūdan, Lifetime Ōi, Lifetime Kisei and Lifetime Ōshō. Among his 80 titles, 18 were the Meijin title (most prestigious title in shogi, along with Ryūō). He has appeared in the Meijin title match 25 times winning 18; he also holds the record for the most consecutive Meijin titles (13 in a row  from 1959 to 1971), the most overall Meijin titles, and being the oldest player to challenge for the Meijin title, at age 63 in 1986.

Ōyama played as professional from 1940 until his death in 1992. His students include Michio Ariyoshi, Isao Nakata and Hisashi Namekata. He was awarded as honorary citizen of Kurashiki, Okayama, his birthplace and then Hyakkoku, Aomori (now merged to Oirase, Aomori).

Ōyama had a strong interest in other kinds of boardgames, including go, mahjong, chess, chu shogi and xiangqi. He founded Japan Xiangqi Association in 1973 and served as its president.

Honours
Medal with Purple Ribbon (1979)
Kikuchi Kan Prize (1987)
Person of Cultural Merit (1990)
Order of the Sacred Treasure, 2nd class, Gold and Silver Star (1992)
Senior Fourth Rank (1992)

Gallery

References

1923 births
1992 deaths
Japanese shogi players
Professional shogi players from Okayama Prefecture
Recipients of the Medal with Purple Ribbon
Persons of Cultural Merit
Deceased professional shogi players
Meijin (shogi)
Tenth Dan
Kisei (shogi)
Ōi (shogi)
Ōshō
Lifetime titles
People from Kurashiki
Ninth Dan
Presidents of the Japan Shogi Association